Boileau is a village and municipality in the Outaouais region of Quebec, Canada, part of the Papineau Regional County Municipality. The municipality was known as Ponsonby until 1993.

Geography
Sparsely populated, inhabited areas are the hamlets of Brookdale and Boileau and also around the Maskinongé Bay and Loup, Champagneur, and Cross Lakes.

History
The area was first named Ponsonby on the Gale and Duberger map of 1795. In all likelihood, it was named after a town in Cumberland County, England. It is also possible that it was named in honour of any of several noted persons called Ponsonby, including the Postmaster General of Canada of 1784, William Ponsonby (1744-1806).

Settlers were attracted to the area by the nature's beauty and resources. They were generally from Ireland and England, or the nearby villages of Calumet and Grenville. In 1876, the Township of Ponsonby was proclaimed. In 1880, the Parish of Sainte-Valérie was formed, and a year later the Boileau post office opened, named after the first postmaster, Pierre Boileau. In 1882, the Township Municipality of Ponsonby was established.

Because the village was better known as Boileau and Ponsonby was limited to purely administrative use, the municipal authorities, with the support of the majority of the population, were granted the official name change from Ponsonby to Boileau in 1993.

Demographics

Mother tongue:
 English as first language: 13.6%
 French as first language: 82.7%
 English and French as first language: 2.5%
 Other as first language: 1.2%

Education

Sir Wilfrid Laurier School Board operates English-language schools:
 Arundel Elementary School in Arundel
 Laurentian Regional High School in Lachute

References

External links

Incorporated places in Outaouais
Municipalities in Quebec